Roberto McLellan (born October 5, 1984), is a Canadian professional boxer in the Middleweight division and is the former Canadian Professional Boxing Council - Light Middleweight Champion.

Professional boxing record

|- style="margin:0.5em auto; font-size:95%;"
|align="center" colspan=8|6 Wins (3 knockouts), 2 Losses, 1 Draw
|- style="margin:0.5em auto; font-size:95%;"
|align=center style="border-style: none none solid solid; background: #e3e3e3"|Res.
|align=center style="border-style: none none solid solid; background: #e3e3e3"|Record
|align=center style="border-style: none none solid solid; background: #e3e3e3"|Opponent
|align=center style="border-style: none none solid solid; background: #e3e3e3"|Type
|align=center style="border-style: none none solid solid; background: #e3e3e3"|Rd., Time
|align=center style="border-style: none none solid solid; background: #e3e3e3"|Date
|align=center style="border-style: none none solid solid; background: #e3e3e3"|Location
|align=center style="border-style: none none solid solid; background: #e3e3e3"|Notes
|-align=center
|Loss || 25-7-4 || align=left| Fitz Vanderpool
|UD || 10 || March 2, 2013 || align=left|Moncton New Brunswick, Moncton Lions Club
|align=left|National Boxing Authority - Middleweight Title
|-align=center
|Win || 8-6-2 || align=left| Anthony Lessard
|KO || 6 (3:00) || March 10, 2011 || align=left|Calgary Alberta, Hyatt Regency Hotel
|align=left|Canadian Professional Boxing Council - Light Middleweight Title
|-align=center
|Loss || 2-0-0 || align=left| Janks Trotter
|TKO || 1 (0:50) || September 17, 2010 || align=left|Calgary Alberta, Subway Soccer Centre
|align=left|
|-align=center
|Win || Debut || align=left| Darcy Boizard
|TKO || 3 (1:18) || May 15, 2010 || align=left|Calgary Alberta, Bowness Sports Plex
|align=left|
|-align=center
|Win || 3-11-1 || align=left| Stephane Chartrand
|TKO || 1 (1:48) || August 7, 2009 || align=left|Prince George British Columbia, Roll-A-Dome
|align=left|
|-align=center
|Win || 7-3-2 || align=left| Codey Hanna
|UD || 5 || May 2, 2009 || align=left|Williams Lake British Columbia, Elks Hall
|align=left|
|-align=center
| || 2-0-0 || align=left| Aubrey Morrow
|UD || 4 || December 27, 2008 || align=left|Coquitlam British Columbia, Red Robinson Show Theatre
|align=left|
|-align=center
|Win || 1-4-2 || align=left| Jean Charlemagne
|UD || 4 || June 28, 2008 || align=left|Williams Lake British Columbia, Williams Lake Arena
|align=left|
|-align=center
|Win || Debut || align=left| Tyler Jackson
|MD || 4 || October 27, 2007 || align=left|Richmond British Columbia, River Rock Casino
|align=left| Pro Debut
|-align=center

CPBC Light Middleweight Championship

On March 10, 2011 the 26-year-old won the CPBC Light Middleweight Championship bout with a spectacular KO stoppage of Anthony "Hits Hard" Lessard in Calgary, Alberta.

Move to Middleweight

Mclellan relinquished his Canadian Professional Boxing Council's Light Middleweight title and made a move to middleweight. On March 2, 2013 he fought Fitz "The Whip" Vanderpool for the National Boxing Authority - Middleweight title and lost a Unanimous Judges Decision to the 45-year-old former World Champion.

References

Roberto McLellan

Living people
Sportspeople from British Columbia
People from the Cariboo Regional District
1984 births
Canadian male boxers